The men's pole vault at the 1962 British Empire and Commonwealth Games as part of the athletics programme was held at the Perry Lakes Stadium on Saturday 1 December 1962.

The event was won by 19-year-old Australian Trevor Bickle. Bickle won by three inches ahead Danie Burger from the Federation of Rhodesia and Nyasaland and the Australian champion Ross Filshie. Bickle's jump of  set three new records. It broke the British Empire and Commonwealth record by one inch, Geoff Elliott's Games record set in Vancouver eight years ago by nine inches and Filshie's Australian national record by three inches.

Records

Final

References

Men's pole vault
1962